Lyubov Varyagina was a Russian film actress.

Selected filmography 
 1909 — Vanka the Steward
 1909 — The Enchantress
 1910 — The Idot
 1911 — Eugene Onegin
 1911 — At a Lively Spot

References

External links 
 Любовь Варягина on kino-teatr.ru

Russian film actresses